Paolo "Pulong" Zimmerman Duterte (born March 24, 1975) is a Filipino politician who is the representative of Davao City's 1st district. He previously served as vice mayor of Davao City from 2013 until his resignation in December 2017.

Paolo Duterte is the eldest son of former mayor of Davao City and 16th Philippine President, Rodrigo Duterte. His sister Sara is the incumbent Vice President of the Philippines, while his brother Sebastian is the incumbent Mayor of Davao City.

Early life and education
Paolo Zimmerman Duterte was born on March 24, 1975, in Davao City. He is the eldest son of lawyer Rodrigo Duterte, who would later become Mayor and Congressman of Davao City and President, and Elizabeth Zimmerman, a Filipina of American and allegedly German Jewish descent. His sister, Sara Duterte, is the incumbent Vice President of the Philippines.

For his elementary and secondary studies, Duterte studied at the Philippine Women's College of Davao, obtaining his high school diploma in 1991. He attended the University of Mindanao, where he obtained his bachelor's degree in Banking & Finance in 2002. Duterte also had graduate studies at the University of Southeastern Philippines, where he attained his master's degree in Public Administration in 2009, and at the Lyceum-Northwestern University, where he attained his doctorate degree in Public Administration in 2015.

In pursuit of his dream in becoming a pilot, he obtained his Airplane Private Pilot License at Mactan Aviation Technology Center Inc. Pilot School in 2018. He is currently working on his Commercial and Multi-Engine Pilot License and Helicopter Pilot Training at CheynAir Aviation.

Career
Paolo Duterte started his career as a politician as a barangay captain of barangay Catalunan Grande in the district of Talomo in Davao City from November 15, 2007, to June 30, 2013. In the later part of his barangay captain stint from July 2011 to June 2013, Duterte was vice president for Mindanao Liga ng mga Barangay National.

He was also part of the 15th and 16th City Council in Davao as a City Councilor, as a sectoral representative of the Association of Barangay Captains (ABC), from January 6, 2008, to June 30, 2013. He was elected as Davao City's Vice Mayor in the 2013 local elections assuming the post on June 30, 2013. He secured a second term in the 2016 local elections.

Duterte later resigned as Vice Mayor of Davao City on December 25, 2017, saying the move was made out of "delicadeza" after his public quarrel with his daughter. This was attributed by Duterte to his "failed marriage" to Lovelie Sangkola describing his former wife as "incorrigible". He thanked the city council and remarked that he is looking forward to the day he is able to "serve the country again". Davao City Council Majority Floor Leader Bernard Al-ag became acting vice mayor upon recognition of his resignation by President Rodrigo Duterte on January 5, 2018.

On October 12, 2018, Duterte filed his candidacy for congressman representing Davao City's 1st congressional district. He was proclaimed the winner by the Commission on Elections on May 14, 2019 and took his oath of office on June 21. In July, he was elected Deputy Speaker of the House for Political Affairs. Some of the bills he authored or co-authored as a congressman includes the creation of a Boracay Island Development Authority, the renaming of Ninoy Aquino International Airport, and the setting up of various department-level government agencies in charge of disaster resilience, OFWs and emergency response.

On July 10, 2020, Duterte is one of the 70 representatives who voted "yes" to deny the franchise renewal of ABS-CBN, in favor of the report from the Technical Working Group.

Duterte was reelected to his second consecutive term as congressman via landslide victory in 2022.

Personal life
Duterte's first wife was Lovelie Sangkola, who was of Tausūg descent, with whom he has 3 children, Omar, Rodrigo II, and Isabelle. Their marriage was annulled in 2006. Paolo then married his longtime girlfriend, January Navares, in December 2010. They have 2 children together, Sabina Duterte and Paolo Duterte II. Navares-Duterte succeeded him as the barangay captain of Barangay Catalunan Grande, Davao City in 2013.

Duterte has two grandchildren, Rodrigo Duterte III, son of Rodrigo Duterte II, born in June 2019; and Arturo Vicente Duterte, son of Omar, born on August 15, 2019.

References

External links
Paolo "Pulong" Duterte's Official website
Paolo Duterte′s profile

|-

1975 births
Living people
People from Davao City
Paolo
Filipino Freemasons
Filipino people of American-Jewish descent
Filipino people of German-Jewish descent
Visayan people
PDP–Laban politicians
Children of presidents of the Philippines
Members of the House of Representatives of the Philippines from Davao City
Deputy Speakers of the House of Representatives of the Philippines
National Unity Party (Philippines) politicians